These are the squads for the national teams participated in the I World Cup of Masters held in the United States, between 19 and 27 January, 1991. The tournament was played in two groups, and the winners were Brazil who beat Argentina by 2-1 in the final.

Group A

Head coach:

Head coach:

Head coach: Luciano do Valle

Group B

Head coach:  Carmelo Faraone

Head coach:

Head coach:

References

http://www.rsssfbrasil.com/sel/brazil198795mr.htm
http://memoria.bn.br/docreader/DocReader.aspx?bib=030015_11&PagFis=24802&Pesq=bulleri
http://trivela.uol.com.br/quando-luciano-valle-treinou-selecao-de-pele-rivellino-zico-e-dinamite/ 
http://www.rsssf.com/tablesp/pele-wc.html
http://memoria.bn.br/docreader/DocReader.aspx?bib=030015_11&PagFis=24802&Pesq=bargas

World Cup of Masters events
1991